Cyclocardia is a genus of molluscs in the family Carditidae.

The related genus Vimentum is sometimes included here.

Species
 Cyclocardia astartoides (Martens, 1878)
†Cyclocardia awamoensis (Harris, 1897)
 Cyclocardia bailyi (J. Q. Burch, 1944)
 Cyclocardia barbarensis (Stearns, 1890)
 Cyclocardia beebei (Hertlein, 1958)
 Cyclocardia borealis – northern cardita
†Cyclocardia christiei (Marwick, 1929)
 Cyclocardia compressa (Reeve, 1843)
 Cyclocardia congelascens (Melvill & Standen, 1912)
 Cyclocardia crassidens (Broderip & Sowerby I, 1829)
 Cyclocardia crebricostata (A. Krause, 1885)
 Cyclocardia dalek Pérez & Del Río, 2017
 Cyclocardia gouldii (Dall, 1903)
†Cyclocardia granulata (Say, 1824)
 Cyclocardia incisa (Dall, 1903)
 Cyclocardia isaotakii (Tiba, 1972)
†Cyclocardia magna Quilty, Darragh, Gallagher & Harding, 2016
†Cyclocardia marama (P. A. Maxwell, 1969)
 Cyclocardia moniliata (Dall, 1903)
†Cyclocardia moniligena Hickman, 2015
 Cyclocardia nipponensis M. Huber, 2010
 Cyclocardia novangliae (E. S. Morse, 1869)
 Cyclocardia ovata (Riabinina, 1952)
†Cyclocardia pseutella (Marwick, 1929)
 Cyclocardia ripensis Popov & Scarlato, 1980
 Cyclocardia rjabininae (Scarlato, 1955)
 Cyclocardia spurca (G.B. Sowerby I, 1833)
 Cyclocardia thouarsii (d'Orbigny, 1842)
 Cyclocardia umnaka (Willett, 1932)
 Cyclocardia velutina (E.A. Smith, 1881)
 Cyclocardia ventricosa (Gould, 1850)

 Extinct species
 †Cyclocardia elegans Lamarck 1806

References

Carditidae
Bivalve genera